Released in 2016, Sol Boricua is Cafêzz' second album.

Description 
James Nadal describes Sol Boricua in All About Jazz Magazine:

"Carmen Noemí, the band's leader, pianist and composer, along with bassist and producer Edgardo Sierra, present an engaging sojourn into the Puerto Rican musical landscape, with a modern point of view. "Sol Boricua," is a salutation to the tropical sun, as the dualistic nature of bomba drumming intertwined with jibaro (mountain music) phrasing on the flute and cuatro, covers the entire tempo of their homeland".

Track listing
All songs composed and arranged by Carmen Noemí (ASCAP)
 Sol Boricua (5:44) Bomba 
 Te Invito un Café (4:40) "Samba Canção" 
 Barista’s Swing (5:13) Jazz Swing 
 El Cafetal (5:08) Aguinaldo 
 Antes que Salga la Luna (5:40) Classical 
 Cortadito (5:29) “Cuban” Guajira 
 Mayi (5:00) Progressive Rock 
 Desde mi Balcón (5:44) “Peruvian” Waltz 
 Just 4 Funk (6:45) Funk 
 Coffee Lovers (6:10) New Age 
 Café no Céu (5:34) Brazilian Rhythms 
 Mujer de la Alborada (4:28) Danza

Personnel

Musicians

Carmen Noemí - Acoustic and Electric Pianos and Synthesizers
Edgardo “Egui” Sierra - Fretted, Fretless and Piccolo Basses, Navarro Pickups and Basses 
Pedro Guzmán - Puerto Rican Cuatro
José Roberto Jiménez - Flute and Tenor Saxophone
Christian Galíndez - Latin Percussion, Bongos, Congas and Bomba Barrels 
Waldemar Reyes - Brazilian and Ethnic Percussion 
Norberto “Tiko” Ortiz - Tenor Saxophone 
Luis Amed Irizarry - Oboe
Jorge Laboy - Electric Guitar 
Joel Torres - Guitar 
Bryan Muñoz - Acoustic Guitar 
Edgardo Sierra Jr. - Alto Saxophone

Engineering
Music Producer: Edgardo “Egui” Sierra 
Recording & Mixing Engineer: Edgardo “Egui” Sierra 
Mastering Engineer: David Rodríguez @ Digital Recording Services

Recorded at
EdS Music Recording - Bayamón, Puerto Rico
Inter Metro Recording Studio, San Juan, Puerto Rico

Additional recording
JL Recording Studio Recording Engineer: Jorge Laboy 
Pasillo Sonoro Studio Recording Engineer: Harold Wendell

Reviews and articles
All About Jazz Magazine - 4.5 Star Review by James Nadal
In January 2017,  Sol Boricua was included on National Foundation for Popular Culture's Top 20 Outstanding Recordings of 2016 produced in Puerto Rico.
Un 'Sol Boricua' Refulgente review by Rafael Vega Cury.
James Nadal's Best Releases of 2016.

References

2016 albums
Cafêzz albums